The 1956 Bowling Green Falcons football team was an American football team that represented Bowling Green State University in the Mid-American Conference (MAC) during the 1956 NCAA University Division football season. In their second season under head coach Doyt Perry, the Falcons compiled an 8–0–1 record (5–0–1 against MAC opponents), won the MAC championship, and outscored all opponents by a combined total of 311 to 99.

The team's statistical leaders were Don Nehlen with 362 passing yards, Vic DeOrio with 816 rushing yards, and Ray Reese with 183 receiving yards. Jack Giroux received the team's Most Valuable Player award. The team set a school record, which still stands, with 10 touchdowns in a 73-0 victory over Defiance College on September 15, 1956.

Schedule

References

Bowling Green
Bowling Green Falcons football seasons
Mid-American Conference football champion seasons
College football undefeated seasons
Bowling Green Falcons football